This is a list of Germany entrepreneurs, businesspeople of Germany nationality or with Germany citizenship.

A–M

 Maximilian Delphinius Berlitz (1998–1999), founder of Berlitz Language Schools
 Carl Bertelsmann (1791-1850), founder of Bertelsmann AG, subsidiaries include Random House and BMG
 Johann Adam Birkenstock, in 1774 founded Birkenstock shoe company
 Hermann Blohm (1848), in 1877, co-founder Blohm+Voss,  manufacturers of ships
 Carl F. W. Borgward (1890–1963), founder of Borgward
 August Borsig (1804–1854), founder of Borsig Werke
 Robert Bosch (1861–1942), industrialist, engineer and inventor; founder of Robert Bosch GmbH
 Hugo Boss (1885–1948), fashion designer, founder of Hugo Boss AG
 Max Braun (1883–1967), founder of Braun GmbH, makers of personal care appliances, coffee makers and other home appliances
 Adolphus Busch (1839–1913), co-founder of Anheuser-Busch brewing company
 Adolph Coors (1847–1929), founder of the Adolph Coors Company brewery, now part of MillerCoors
 Gottlieb Daimler (1834–1900), inventor, engineer and industrialist; founder of Daimler Motoren Gesellschaft, now Daimler AG
 Adolf Dassler (1900–1978), founder of sportswear company Adidas
 Rudolf Dassler (1898–1974), founder of sportwear company Puma
 Adelbert Delbrück (1822–1899), co-founder of Deutsche Bank
 Guido Henckel von Donnersmarck (1830–1916), founder of company  Schlesische AG für Bergbau und Zinkhüttenbetrieb 
 Friedrich Engelhorn (1821–1902), founder of the chemical company BASF
 Kaspar Faber (1730–1784), founder of Faber-Castell, manufacturers of office supplies, art supplies, writing instruments and leather goods
 Günther Fielmann (born 1939), founder of Fielmann
 Wilhelm von Finck (1848–1924), co-founder of Munich Re and Allianz
 Eduard Fresenius (1874–1946), founder of Fresenius
 Jakob Fugger the Elder (1368–1469), founder of Fugger bank
 Marcus Goldman (1821–1904), co-founder of Goldman Sachs
 Max Grundig (1908–1989), founder of Grundig
 Franz Haniel (1779–1868), managing director of Franz Haniel & Cie.
 Karl Haniel (1877–1944), managing director of Franz Haniel & Cie.
 Edmund Heckler (1906–1960), co-founder Heckler & Koch, 1948
 Ernst Heinkel (1888–1958), founder of Heinkel, manufacturers of airplanes
 Richard Hellmann (1876–1971), founder of Hellmann's Mayonnaise
 Johann Peter Henckels, founder of (Zwilling) J.A. Henckels, manufacturers of kitchen knives, scissors, cookware and flatware
 Friedrich Karl Henkel (1848–1930), founder of Henkel
 Max Herz (1905–1965), co-founder of Tchibo, 1949
 Dietmar Hopp (born 1940), co-founder of SAP
 August Horch (1868–1951), founder of Audi automobile company in 1909
 Helmut Horten (1909–1987), founder of Horten AG
 Georg Ferdinand Howaldt (1802–1883), founder of Howaldtswerke-Deutsche Werft in 1835
 Carolus Magnus Hutschenreuther (1794–1845), founder of Hutschenreuther
 Christoph Ingenhoven (1960), founder of ingenhoven architects 
 Hugo Junkers (1859–1935), founder of Junkers in 1895, manufacturers of airplanes
 Rudolph Karstadt (1856–1944), founder of Karstadt
 Ernst Keil (1816–1878), founder and publisher of Die Gartenlaube
 Erich Kellerhals (1939–2017), co-founder of Media Markt
 Carl Kellner, founder of Ernst Leitz GmbH, which later became Leica Camera AG, Leica Geosystems AG, and Leica Microsystems AG, producing cameras, geosurvey equipment and microscopes
 Roman Kirsch, founder of Lesara
 Carl Heinrich Theodor Knorr (1800–1875) founder of Knorr
 Georg Krauß (1826–1906), co-founder of Krauss-Maffei, 1838
 Theodor Koch (1905–1976), co-founder of Heckler & Koch, 1948
 Friedrich Krupp (1787–1826), steel manufacturer and founder of the steel producers ThyssenKrupp AG
 Heinrich Lanz (1838–1905), founder of Heinrich Lanz AG
 Henry Lehman (1822–1855), Emanuel Lehman (1827–1907) and Mayer Lehman (1830–1897), German-born bankers, co-founders of Lehman Brothers
 Ernst Leitz II (1871–1956), owner of Leitz Camera
 Louis Leitz (1846–1918), founder of Leitz
 Carl von Linde (1842–1934), founder of The Linde Group
 Henry Lomb (1828–1908), co-founder of Bausch & Lomb
 Friedrich Lürssen (1851–1916), founder of Lürssen in 1875, manufacturers of ships
 Joseph Anton von Maffei (1790–1870), founder of Maffei, later 1838 Krauss-Maffei
 Wolfgang Marguerre (born 1941), founder of Octapharma
 Carl Alexander von Martius (1838–1920), co-founder of Agfa
 Oscar Ferdinand Mayer (1859–1955), founder of the processed-meat firm Oscar Mayer
 Friedrich Jacob Merck (1621–1678), founder of Merck KGaA (Engel-Apotheke in Darmstadt)
 George Merck (1867–1926), founder of Merck & Co.
 Joseph Mendelssohn (1770–1848), founder of former bank Mendelssohn & Co.
 Paul Mendelssohn Bartholdy (1841–1880), co-founder of Agfa
 Willy Messerschmitt (1898–1978), founder of Messerschmitt
 Heinrich Meyerfreund, founder of Garoto, chocolate company in Brazil
 Carl Miele (1869–1938), founder of Miele, manufacturer of domestic appliances
 Frederick Miller (born as Friedrich Eduard Johannes Müller) (1824–1888), founder of the Miller Brewing Company in 1855

N–Z
 Josef Neckermann (1912–1992), founder of the company Neckermann
 August Oetker (1862–1918), founder of the company Dr Oetker
 Adam Opel (1837–1895), founder of the automobile company Adam Opel AG
 Franz Oppenheim (1852–1929), chemist, industrialist and entrepreneur
 Salomon Oppenheim (1772–1828), founder of bank Sal. Oppenheim
 Ernest Oppenheimer (1880–1957), diamond and gold mining entrepreneur, financier and philanthropist, who controlled De Beers and founded the Anglo American Corporation of South Africa
 Werner Otto (1909–2011), founder of Otto GmbH, now Otto Group, a mail order company
 Hasso Plattner (born 1944), co-founder of SAP
 Ferdinand Porsche (1875–1951), designer and founder of Porsche
 Günther Quandt (1881–1954), industrial, entrepreneur of different companies (today includes BMW AG and Altana (chemicals)
 Karl Friedrich Rapp (1882–1962), co-founder of Rapp Motorenwerke GmbH, which later became BMW AG
 Emil Rathenau (1838–1915), founder of AEG
 Paul Reuter (1816–1899), pioneer of telegraphy and news reporting; founder of Reuters news agency
 Hans Riegel, Sr. (1893–1945), founder of Haribo, the manufacturer of gummi and jelly sweets
 Nathan Mayer Rothschild (1777–1836), founder of British company N M Rothschild & Sons
 Ernst Christian Friedrich Schering (1824–1889), founder of the pharmaceutical company Schering AG 
 Gustav Schickedanz (1895–1977), founder of Quelle
 Anton Schlecker (born 1944), founder of Schlecker
 Ernst Schmidt and Wilhelm Schmidt-Ruthenbeck (1906–1988), founders of Metro AG
 Dieter Schwarz (born 1939), owner of Schwarz Gruppe
 Alex Seidel (1909–1989), co-founder of Heckler & Koch, 1948
 Fritz Sennheiser (1912–2010), founder of Sennheiser Electronic GmbH & Co. KG, specializing in high-fidelity products
 Georg von Siemens (1839–1901), co-founder of Deutsche Bank
 Werner von Siemens (1816–1892), inventor, founder of Siemens, the electronics and electrical engineering company
 Friedrich Soennecken (1848–1919), founder of Soennecken
 J.S. Staedtler, in 1835 founded Staedtler Mars GmbH & Co. KG, suppliers of writing, artist, and engineering drawing instruments
 Bruno Steinhoff (born 1937), founder of Steinhoff
 Henry E. Steinway (1797–1871), founder of the piano company Steinway & Sons
 Hugo Stinnes (1870–1924), co-founder of Rheinisch-Westfälisches Elektrizitätswerk AG 
 August Storck-Oberwelland, in 1903 founder of Werther's Sugar Confectionery Factory, now August Storck AG
 Franz Ströher (c. 1854–1936), in 1880 founded cosmetics company Wella AG
 Carl Tchilinghiryan (1910–1987), in 1949, co-founder of company Tchibo
 Carl von Thieme (1844–1924), founder of Allianz AG, a financial services company
 August Thyssen (1842–1926), founder of Walzwerk Thyssen & Co. in Mülheim an der Ruhr
 Friedrich Thyssen (1804–1877), founder of Draht-Fabrik-Compagnie in Aachen 
 Hermann Tietz (1837–1907), founder of Hertie, a department store 
 Klaus Tschira (1940–2015), co-founder of SAP
 Leopold Ullstein (1826–1899), founder of publishing company Ullstein Verlag
 Ernst Voss (1842–1920), in 1877, co-founder of Blohm+Voss, manufacturers of ships
 Carl Walther (1858–1915), founder of company Carl Walther, manufacturer of guns
 Moses Marcus Warburg and Gerson Warburg, co-founder of M. M. Warburg & Co., German bank
 Siegmund Warburg, founder of S. G. Warburg & Co., British bank
 Claus Wellenreuther (born 1935), co-founder of SAP
 Bartholomeus V. Welser (1484–1561), Welser brothers bank
 Georg Wertheim (1857–1939), founder of Wertheim, a department store
 Aloys Wobben (1952–2021), founder of Enercon
 Reinhold Würth (born 1935), company Würth
 Carl Zeiss (1816–1888), founder of Carl Zeiss AG, a maker of optical instruments
 Ferdinand von Zeppelin (1838–1917), inventor of the Zeppelin; founder of the Zeppelin Airship company

Entrepreneurs
Entrepreneurs
German